Frank Gill (born 5 December 1948) is an English footballer, who played as a winger in the Football League for Tranmere Rovers.

Gill started his career as an apprentice with Manchester United, before joining Tranmere Rovers in 1968. He went on to play for Altrincham.

References

1948 births
Living people
English footballers
Footballers from Manchester
Association football wingers
Manchester United F.C. players
Tranmere Rovers F.C. players
Altrincham F.C. players
English Football League players